Gissur Ísleifsson (ca 1042–1118;;) was an Icelandic clergyman  who, in 1082, became the second Catholic bishop of Iceland in the aftermath of the adoption of Christianity by the island's inhabitants.
He followed in the footsteps of his father, Ísleifur Gissurarson (1006–1080), Iceland's first bishop, who established the initial episcopal see at the family homestead in Skálholt and served from 1056 until his death in 1080, Gissur Ísleifsson continued his mission at Skálholt for the next 36 years, with his own death coming in the year 1118.

See also
List of Skálholt bishops

References

External links
Gissur Ísleifsson at www.skolavefurinn.is (password required)

11th-century Roman Catholic bishops in Iceland
12th-century Roman Catholic bishops in Iceland
1040s births
1118 deaths
Married Roman Catholic bishops
11th-century Icelandic people